Philiscus may refer to:

 Philiscus of Athens comic poet
 Philiscus of Aegina (4th century BC) Cynic philosopher
 Philiscus of Abydos (4th century BC)
 Philiscus of Miletus rhetorician, see Neanthes of Cyzicus
 Philiscus of Corcyra (c. 300 BC) tragic poet
 Philiscus of Rhodes sculptor, see Temple of Apollo Sosianus
 Alcaeus and Philiscus (2nd-century BC) two Epicurean philosophers expelled from Rome in either 173 BC or 154 BC.
 Philiscus of Thessaly (2nd-3rd century) Sophist
Stefanus Philiscus of Soncino (15th century) Italian scholar